Agaun Airport  is an airfield in Agaun, in the Milne Bay Province of Papua New Guinea.

References

External links
 

Airports in Papua New Guinea
Milne Bay Province